is a private junior college in Hiratsuka, Kanagawa, Japan. The college was opened in 1974, and is affiliated with Tokai University.

Departments
 Department of nursing

Notable alumni
 Misako Aoki, model

External links
 

Private universities and colleges in Japan
Japanese junior colleges
Universities and colleges in Kanagawa Prefecture
Nursing schools in Japan
Educational institutions established in 1974
Hiratsuka, Kanagawa